Ronald Paternoster (20 August 1916 – 21 August 2002) was an Australian rules footballer who played with Footscray and Hawthorn in the Victorian Football League (VFL).

Paternoster later served in the Australian Army during World War II.

Notes

External links 
		

1916 births
2002 deaths
Australian rules footballers from Victoria (Australia)
Western Bulldogs players
Hawthorn Football Club players
Australian Army personnel of World War II
People from Benalla
Military personnel from Victoria (Australia)